Arram railway station serves the small village of Arram in the East Riding of Yorkshire, England. It is located on the Yorkshire Coast Line and is operated by Northern who provide all passenger train services. It is mentioned in the song "Slow Train" by Flanders and Swann.

History
Opened by the York and North Midland Railway, then by the North Eastern Railway, it became part of the London and North Eastern Railway during the Grouping of 1923. The station then passed on to the North Eastern Region of British Railways on nationalisation in 1948.

When Sectorisation was introduced in the 1980s, the station was served by Regional Railways 
until the Privatisation of British Railways.

Facilities
The station is unstaffed and has very basic facilities (the station house is privately owned and all the other buildings have been demolished, leaving only waiting shelters on each platform).  The platforms are staggered, either side of a half-barrier level crossing and each has level access from the road.  No ticket machine is provided, so passengers must buy tickets in advance or on the train.

Services
The station has a limited service compared with others on the route due to the rural nature of the area it serves - currently six services call here in each direction (Monday to Saturday).  On Sundays two northbound trains call at 08:54 (to Scarborough) and 17:45 (to Bridlington) and two southbound to Hull at 10:08 and 18:50.

Routes

References

External links

 Station on navigable O.S. map

Railway stations in the East Riding of Yorkshire
DfT Category F2 stations
Railway stations in Great Britain opened in 1853
Northern franchise railway stations
Stations on the Hull to Scarborough line
Former York and North Midland Railway stations
George Townsend Andrews railway stations